Sony Xperia TX (also known as Sony LT29i) is an Android high-end smartphone from Sony Mobile Communications introduced on 29 August 2012, the Xperia TX is a version of the Sony Xperia GX SO-04D which was launched in May 2012 in Japan. It is Sony's first smartphone built on Qualcomm's Snapdragon S4 (MSM8260A) platform. The Xperia TX was officially released in October 2012 in three colors: Black, White and Pink.

Design
Similar to the previous smartphones that Sony has released, the Sony Xperia TX has a curvy and inwards arching design with a plastic finish. On the back of the device, Sony Ericsson's liquid energy logo still can be seen with the Xperia branding. The device does not feature any physical navigation buttons as the buttons are integrated into the software.

Specifications

Hardware
The Sony Xperia TX is very similar to the Xperia T except for having a slightly older processor and GPU. It shares a 4.55-inch high-definition display with 1280 by 720 pixels and a pixel density of 323 ppi with Sony's Mobile BRAVIA Engine. There is also a shatterproof sheet on the scratch-resistant glass which prevents the glass pieces of the display from falling out if it breaks. The camera has 13 megapixels with LED flash, Exmor R, 16 times digital zoom and HD (1080p) video recording, it also features a 1.3-megapixel front-facing camera capable of 720p for video recording. The device features Snapdragon S4 MSM8260A SoC with 1.5 GHz dual-core CPU, 1 GB of RAM, 16 GB of built in storage, a microSD expansion slot of up to 32 GB, HDMI via MHL support to connect to TVs. It is also equipped with NFC (near field communication) enabled which can be used with Xperia SmartTags, or for low value financial transactions, as NFC becomes more widespread in use, with the appropriate applications from Google Play.

The Xperia TX has HSPA+, while the LT30a adds in full LTE capabilities. The LT30at (sold as the Xperia TL) has a subset of LTE specifically for AT&T's network.

Software
The Sony Xperia TX was released with Android 4.0.4 Ice Cream Sandwich with Sony's custom launcher with some notable additions to the software which includes Sony's Media applications – Walkman, Album and Videos. The device comes with NFC which allows 'one touch' to mirror what is on the smartphone to compatible TVs or play music on a NFC wireless speaker. Additionally, the phone includes a battery stamina mode which increases the phone's standby time up to 4 times. Several Google applications (such as Google Chrome, Google Voice Search, Google Talk application, Google Mail and Google Maps with Street View and Latitude) already come preloaded.

The 4.1.2 Jelly Bean update for the Xperia TX was released on March 27, 2013.The 4.3 Jelly Bean update for Xperia TX was released on February, 2014.

See also
 Comparison of smartphones

References

External links
 
 Xperia TX (LT29i) whitepaper from Sony Mobile 

Android (operating system) devices
Mobile phones introduced in 2012
Discontinued smartphones
TX